Georgi Korudzhiev (born 2 March 1988) is a Bulgarian footballer who plays as a midfielder.

References

External links 
 Profile at sports.md
 

1988 births
Living people
Bulgarian footballers
FC Sopron players
Botev Plovdiv players
FC Spartak Plovdiv players
FC Sportist Svoge players
FC Zimbru Chișinău players
PFC Kaliakra Kavarna players
FC Bihor Oradea players
PFC Spartak Varna players
PFC Lokomotiv Plovdiv players
FC Haskovo players
Békéscsaba 1912 Előre footballers
FC Montana players
FC Tsarsko Selo Sofia players
Bulgarian expatriate footballers
Expatriate footballers in Hungary
Expatriate footballers in Moldova
Expatriate footballers in Romania
Nemzeti Bajnokság I players
Moldovan Super Liga players
First Professional Football League (Bulgaria) players
Liga II players
Association football midfielders
Bulgarian expatriate sportspeople in Hungary